Jo Ann Davis (née Sides; June 29, 1950 – October 6, 2007) was an American politician who served as a member of the United States House of Representatives from 2001 to 2007. A member of the Republican Party from Virginia, she represented the state's . She was the second woman and first Republican woman elected to Congress from Virginia.

Early life and education 
Jo Ann Sides was born in Rowan County, North Carolina, but lived in Virginia starting when she was nine years old. She graduated from Kecoughtan High School in Hampton, Virginia. Davis attended Hampton Roads Business College.

Career
Davis worked in real estate before she was elected to the Virginia House of Delegates in 1997. She was re-elected in 1999.

In 2000, 1st District Representative Herbert H. Bateman, a 72-year-old incumbent, announced his retirement because of health concerns. He died on September 11, 2000. Davis ran for and won the Republican nomination to succeed him, despite Governor Jim Gilmore's having endorsed her primary opponent; she beat out four other opponents in the primary. In November 2000, she received 58% of the vote to win the seat, defeating Democrat Lawrence A. Davies, and Independents Sharon A. Wood and Josh Billings.

She was the second Virginia woman (after Democrat Leslie Byrne who served one term from the neighboring  from 1993 to 1995), and the first Virginia Republican woman elected to the House in her own right. The First is one of the most Republican-leaning districts in Virginia (no Democrat has won the district since 1977, and only the neighboring  is considered more Republican). Davis was reelected unopposed in 2002. She defeated Independent challenger William A. Lee in 2004. She won a fourth term in 2006 against token Democratic opposition, defeating Democrat Shawn M. O'Donnell and Independent Marvin F. Pixton III. Unlike Bateman, who was relatively moderate by Southern Republican standards, Davis was strongly conservative, especially on social issues.

During her tenure, Davis secured $169 million (after authorizing $229 million) for construction on the Navy's next-generation aircraft carrier, CVN-21, and $47 million for the removal of a portion of the James River Reserve Fleet, otherwise known as the Ghost Fleet. In 2002 she voted in favor of the Authorization for Use of Military Force Against Iraq Resolution of 2002.

In March 2001, the House passed Davis's first piece of legislation – HR 1015, the SGLI Adjustment Act, which increased the amount of Servicemembers' Group Life Insurance paid to beneficiaries of members of the Armed Forces who died in the performance of their duty between November 1, 2000, and April 1, 2001. She advocated tax cuts, and believed that the federal government must rein in growth and spending. She was the ranking Republican on the House Intelligence Subcommittee on Intelligence Policy.

Davis was endorsed by several groups, including the Virginia Sheriff's Association; the Peninsula Housing and Builders Association; the Virginia Society for Human Life; the National Rifle Association, and the Madison Project. She received a 93% rating from the National Federation of Independent Businesses for the 109th Congress, a grade of 95% from the Family Foundation of Virginia, and an "A" rating from the NRA Virginia Political Preference Chart. Other ratings included a 0% from the National Education Association, a 23% from the League of Conservation Voters, a 0% from the Children's Defense Fund, and a 4% from the American Civil Liberties Union.

Personal life
Davis was one of four Pentecostals in the 109th Congress. The others were Todd Tiahrt of Kansas, Tim Johnson of Illinois, and Marilyn Musgrave of Colorado.

In 1974 she married Chuck Davis; the couple had two sons and were married for 33 years.

Davis was diagnosed in September 2005 with breast cancer and underwent a partial mastectomy on July 5, 2006, at the George Washington University Medical Center in Washington, D.C. The pathology report indicated that there was no further evidence of cancer, and Davis stated that she would return to work as usual. She attended House sessions until shortly before her death.

Death 
Davis died on October 6, 2007, at her home in Gloucester, Virginia. She was reportedly recovering from a second bout with breast cancer, but her condition deteriorated rapidly over the week preceding her death. Davis was survived by her husband, Chuck Davis, two sons, and a granddaughter.

Electoral history

*Write-in and minor candidate notes:  In 2000, write-ins received 537 votes.  In 2006, write-ins received 326 votes.

See also
 List of United States Congress members who died in office
 Women in the United States House of Representatives

References

External links
 
 
 Federal Election Commission – campaign finance reports and data
 On the Issues – issue positions and quotes
 OpenSecrets.org – campaign contributions
 Project Vote Smart – Representative Jo Ann S. Davis (VA) profile
 Washington Post – Congress Votes Database – voting record

1950 births
2007 deaths
Republican Party members of the Virginia House of Delegates
People from Gloucester Courthouse, Virginia
Deaths from breast cancer
American Pentecostals
Female members of the United States House of Representatives
Deaths from cancer in Virginia
Women state legislators in Virginia
People from Rowan County, North Carolina
Republican Party members of the United States House of Representatives from Virginia
20th-century American politicians
20th-century American women politicians
21st-century American politicians
21st-century American women politicians